The following lists events that have happened in 1807 in the Qajar dynasty, Iran.

Incumbents
 Monarch: Fat′h-Ali Shah Qajar

Events
 May 4 – Treaty of Finckenstein was signed between Iran and France.

References

 
Iran
Years of the 19th century in Iran
1800s in Iran
Iran